{{DISPLAYTITLE:C22H30O3}}
The molecular formula C22H30O3 (molar mass : 342.47 g/mol) may refer to:

 Anacardic acid, a chemical compound found in the shell of the cashew nut
 Endrisone, a steroid
 Megestrol, a progesterone derivative with antineoplastic properties used in the treatment of advanced carcinoma of the breast and endometrium
 Sargachromanol A
 SC-5233, an antimineralocorticoid
 Trimegestone, a steroid